"China Heroically Stands in the Universe" was the national anthem of China from 1915 to 1921.

History 

It was issued by the Ritual Regulations Office in June 1915 as the national anthem of the Republic of China and was adopted on 23 May 1915. Its lyrics were written by Yin Chang and music by Wang Lu.

After Yuan Shikai declared himself Emperor of China in December 1915, the lyrics of the anthem were slightly modified and turned into the national anthem of the Empire of China. The lyrics were abolished again in 1916 after his death and replaced by lyrics written by Zhang Zuolin. The song was no longer the official anthem after 31 March 1921, when Song to the Auspicious Cloud again became the national anthem.

Lyrics

Original Lyrics during the Republic of China (May–Dec. 1915)

Lyrics during the Empire of China (1916)

Shanrang (Demise) referred to the ancient system of Chinese emperors relinquishing their positions to each other in Yao and Shun's era.

Lyrics during the Republic of China (1916–1921)

See also 
Historical Chinese anthems

External links 
 
 
 Music, lyrics, and sheet music

Historical national anthems
National symbols of the Republic of China (1912–1949)
Chinese patriotic songs
1915 songs
Asian anthems
Songs about China